Gadang is an Afro-Asiatic language spoken in southwestern Chad.

Notes 

East Chadic languages
Languages of Chad